Black Butterflies is a 1928 American silent drama film directed by James W. Horne and starring Jobyna Ralston, Mae Busch and Robert Frazer.

Cast
 Jobyna Ralston as Dorinda Maxwell 
 Mae Busch as Kitty Perkins 
 Robert Frazer as David 
 Lila Lee as Norma Davis 
 Cosmo Kyrle Bellew as Judge Davis 
 Robert Ober as Jimmie 
 Ray Hallor as Chad 
 George Periolat as Hatch

References

Bibliography
 Goble, Alan. The Complete Index to Literary Sources in Film. Walter de Gruyter, 1999.

External links
 

1928 films
1928 drama films
1920s English-language films
American silent feature films
Silent American drama films
Films directed by James W. Horne
American black-and-white films
1920s American films